The Balai are an Indian caste.

Balai may also refer to:

 Balai of Qenneshrin, a Syriac saint
 Balai Pustaka
 Tanjung Balai (disambiguation)
 Tanjung Balai Karimun, a port and town of Great Karimun island in Riau Islands province
 Kampung Balai
 Gong Balai
 Chenderong Balai
 Balai Ringin
 Balai Sarbini
 Balai, Iran, a village in Kermanshah Province